Wanamassa was a Native American chief of the 17th century.

Honors
The town of Wanamassa, New Jersey, New Jersey, is named for Wanamassa.
 The United States Navy large harbor tug USS Wanamassa (YTB-820), in commission since 1973, is named for him.

References
 (ship namesake paragraph)

Native American leaders
17th-century Native Americans

Year of birth missing
Year of death missing